We Interrupt This Program... is a 1975 play by Norman Krasna.

In 1975 ABC provided $125,000 for a production by Alexander Cohen. The play premiered in 1975 and received bad reviews.

Plot
This play's audience is held hostage by a group of criminals seeking the release of an imprisoned friend.

References

External links
 
 

1975 plays
Plays by Norman Krasna